Salame Felino is a variety of Italian salame historically produced in the municipality of Felino (hence the name) and in some neighboring municipalities, such as Sala Baganza and Langhirano, all in the province of Parma. Having obtained the European certification of "Protected Geographical Indication", this salami is protected from counterfeiting.

Preparation
Salame Felino is traditionally produced with pure pork meat. The mixture is made up of pork called "bench mince" (shoulder of the animal), roughly made up of 70% lean and 30% selected fat parts. The grinding takes place with medium dies, obtaining a medium-coarse-grained mixture that is added with salt, whole-grain pepper. Small amounts of potassium nitrate are usually added and sometimes ascorbates (antioxidants and acidity regulators) and sugars as well. After grinding, crushed garlic and pepper are also added and dissolved in dry white wine, then the mixture is stuffed into natural pork casing of Danish origin. Traditionally, for the packaging of Felino salami, the so-called gentle intestine is used, that is the intestinal part of the pig that corresponds to the rectum: it is a smooth-looking and thick gut, which allows to keep the dough soft which it also contains after long curing. The ideal seasoning for Felino salami is at least 60 days, favored by the particular microclimate of the Parma area. Today, the majority of Salame Felino producers use special rooms at a controlled temperature for the seasoning of the product.

Organoleptic characteristics
It comes with a slice of intense red color, with the white of the ground fat. The compactness of the meat is closely linked to the seasoning and quality of the meat used to produce the salami. The scent is intense, very characteristic, while the flavor is delicate.

Use
It is one of the most typical appetizers of the Parma area, especially when paired with Parma ham, which is produced in the same area. Usually, it goes well with a Lambrusco wine. Traditionally it is cut diagonally, thus creating oval slices, approximately double the length of the diameter of the salami. To taste it at its best, thickness is very important: traditionally the slices must be as thick as a peppercorn.

References

Italian products with protected designation of origin
Italian sausages
Cuisine of Emilia-Romagna